Adam Kaspar Hesselbach (15 January 1788 – 7 May 1856) was a German surgeon and anatomist. He is the son of Franz Kaspar Hesselbach. In 1818 Hesselbach became a Dr. phil. et medicinae in Würzburg. After that he was professor for surgery in Würzburg (1828-1833) and Bamberg (1836-1843).

Works 
  (description of the human eye), 1820
  (description of the pathologic compounds, which are at the royal anatomic institute of Würzburg), 1824
  (the safest art of an abdominal cut in the groin), 1819
  (theory of the ruptures), 1829/30.

1788 births
1856 deaths
German surgeons